Musa banksii is a species of wild banana (genus Musa), native to New Guinea and Australia (Queensland), and most likely introduced to Samoa. It was first described by Ferdinand von Mueller in 1863 from plants collected in Queensland, Australia. Thereafter, taxonomists have variously treated it as a unique species or as a subspecies of Musa acuminata. The first one to note an affinity with Musa acuminata was Ernest E. Cheesman in 1948.  In 1957, Norman Simmonds reclassified it as a subspecies of Musa acuminata based on extensive field observations in New Guinea, Australia, and Samoa. In 1976, George Argent chose to treat it as a species.

References

External links 
Musa acuminata ssp. banksii

banksii
Taxa named by Ferdinand von Mueller
Flora of Papuasia
Flora of Queensland